Tia Ra'shone Brooks (August 2, 1990) is an American shot putter.  In 2011, she placed second in the shot put at both the NCAA Indoor and Outdoor Championships.  In 2012, she won both events before competing at the US Olympic Trials.  At the Trials, she placed third in the shot put and qualified to represent the United States at the 2012 Summer Olympics.  She placed 19th at the Olympics. Also in 2012, she was a Bowerman Award semifinalist.

Early life
Tia Ra'shone Brooks was born August 2, 1990 in Saginaw, Michigan to parents Cyd D. Neal and David Brooks. At East Kentwood High School, she primarily ran sprint events before her coach, John Makinen convinced her that she was better suited for throwing events. Initially, she fought the change and threatened to quit track and field.  "I didn't really want to throw the shot put," she explained. "I didn't want to be the stereotypical thrower ... the big girl who didn't run and wasn't athletic."  After a heart-to-heart talk with her mother, Brooks relented. During high school, she was a four-time all-state honoree and a two-time regional champion. In her final year, she won the 2008 state title with a 14.65m (48' 0½"). She finished second in both the discus and shot put at the Midwest Meet of Champions.

Brooks attended University of Oklahoma. During her first year, she lost feeling in her legs while lifting weights and had to be carried out on a spine board. She was diagnosed with degenerative disc disorder, two bulging discs, and a narrowing of the spine. Her doctor advised her to give up the shot put, but Brooks pressed on. After a year of rehab and strength training, she returned to the sport in 2010. She graduated from Oklahoma in 2013.

University of Oklahoma
In 2011, she was the runner-up in the shot put at both the NCAA Indoor and Outdoor Championships. At the national championships, she finished fifth.

She was named first team All-American in both the indoor and outdoor events and was a Bowerman Award semifinalist, an award given annually to the country's top track and field student-athlete.

At the 2012 US Olympic Trials, Brooks threw the shot put  on her second attempt. The distance held up and she won third place.  The throw qualified her to compete in the 2012 Summer Olympics.  Afterwards she said, "It's so surreal. When I found out I made it, I cried."

Brooks entered the Olympics seeded 16th. Her throw placed her 19th overall and was well short of the  necessary to make the top eight and advance to the finals. Brooks was joined at the Olympics by Oklahoma teammate and close friend Brittany Borman, who won the javelin at The Olympic Trials.

Brooks was coached by former Olympian, Brian Blutreich. She holds two school records in the shot put.

Professional
Tia competed in the 2014 USA Outdoor Track and Field Championships in Sacramento, California where she earned bronze medal in shot put with a throw of 18.83 m 61' 9 ½".
Tia is represented by Nike and trains at the Olympic Training Center in San Diego, California under the tutelage of Art Venegas.

Personal life
Brooks attended East Kentwood High School where she played varsity on their track team. Brooks currently lives in Kentwood, Michigan.  She has four siblings: Tor'i and DeMarcus Brooks, David Brooks Jr., and Teiah Faulk.

References

External links

1990 births
Living people
American female shot putters
Oklahoma Sooners women's track and field athletes
Olympic track and field athletes of the United States
Athletes (track and field) at the 2012 Summer Olympics
Sportspeople from Saginaw, Michigan
World Athletics Championships athletes for the United States